Isthmus-34 Light is a sour crude oil produced in Mexico mainly in the Campeche zone, in the Gulf of Mexico along with the extraction centers in Chiapas, Tabasco, and Veracruz. The name derives from the nearby Isthmus of Tehuantepec. Before 2017, the oil was a component of the OPEC Reference Basket (despite Mexico's not being a part of OPEC).  It has the following characteristics:

See also

 Cantarell Field

References

Benchmark crude oils
Pemex
Gulf Coast of Mexico
Petroleum industry in Mexico